Ruslan Usaw (born 4 August 1979) is a retired Belarusian professional footballer.

Honours
Gomel
 Belarusian Premier League champion: 2003

Naftan Novopolotsk
 Belarusian Cup winner: 2008–09

External links

1979 births
Living people
Belarusian footballers
Association football forwards
FC Naftan Novopolotsk players
FC Vitebsk players
FC ZLiN Gomel players
FC Gomel players
FC Belshina Bobruisk players
FC DSK Gomel players
FC Khimik Svetlogorsk players